Springtime Serenade is a 1935 short cartoon made by Walter Lantz Productions, and features Oswald the Lucky Rabbit. While most shorts in the series are shot in black and white, this one is among the very few that are in color.

Plot
After a long winter in the countryside, the snow finally melted and the animals came out of hibernation. A squirrel merrily runs around and heads to the groundhog's house to tell the latter of the good news.

Upon coming out and hearing what the squirrel told him, the groundhog turned around and was surprised to see his shadow on the wall of his house. He then warns the squirrel and the other animals nearby that if his shadow is visible, more days of snow await. The other animals, however, were doubtful of his advice and therefore took it as a joke.

On another part of the countryside, Oswald and an unnamed sister of his are working on their inn after it had been closed for the winter. They dust the furniture and shake the dirt off the carpets. After completing their tasks, the inn was ready for service. Oswald and his sister went outside for a little stroll.

As the two inn operators are at the open and spending time with some animals, the groundhog approached and warn them once more about more winter days coming. Again, they all thought it was just a bluff and began to laugh. But they would stop laughing when snowflakes fall to the ground. Finally realizing the truth of the groundhog's warning, everybody hurried back indoors.

Availability
The short is available on The Woody Woodpecker and Friends Classic Cartoon Collection: Volume 2 DVD box set.

See also
Oswald the Lucky Rabbit filmography

References

External links
 Springtime Serenade at the Big Cartoon Database

1935 films
1935 animated films
1930s American animated films
1930s animated short films
Films directed by Walter Lantz
Oswald the Lucky Rabbit cartoons
Universal Pictures short films
Walter Lantz Productions shorts
Universal Pictures animated short films
Animated films about animals